Toni Rimrod (born 22 January 1948) is a German volleyball player. He competed in the men's tournament at the 1972 Summer Olympics.

References

External links
 

1948 births
Living people
German men's volleyball players
Olympic volleyball players of West Germany
Volleyball players at the 1972 Summer Olympics
People from Schweinfurt
Sportspeople from Lower Franconia